Vincent John Gerald Cunningham (born 14 March 1967, in Dublin) is a former Ireland international rugby union player. He played as a centre.

He had 16 caps for Ireland, from 1988 to 1994, scoring three tries and one conversion, 14 points in aggregate. The Irish centre played two matches at the 1991 Rugby World Cup finals. He played twice at the Five Nations, in 1993 and 1994.

He toured New Zealand in 1993 with the British and Irish Lions and at the time played club rugby for St. Mary's College R.F.C.

External links
Ireland profile
Vincent Cunningham International Statistics

References

1967 births
Living people
Irish rugby union players
Ireland international rugby union players
British & Irish Lions rugby union players from Ireland
St Mary's College RFC players
Rugby union centres
Ireland international rugby sevens players
Rugby union players from Dublin (city)